The medial epicondyle of the femur is an epicondyle, a bony protrusion, located on the medial side of the femur at its distal end.

Located above the medial condyle, it bears an elevation, the adductor tubercle, which serves for the attachment of the superficial part, or "tendinous insertion", of the adductor magnus.  This tendinous part here forms an intermuscular septum which forms the medial separation between the thigh's flexors and extensors.<ref name="Platzer-242

The anterior long fibers of the tibial collateral ligament of the knee-joint are attached to it.

Behind it, and proximal to the medial condyle is a rough impression which gives origin to the medial head of the Gastrocnemius.

See also
 Lateral epicondyle of the femur
 Medial epicondyle of the humerus

Notes

Additional images

References

External links
 
 

Bones of the lower limb
Femur